The 2004–05 Premier Academy League Under–18 season was the 8th edition since the establishment of The Premier Academy League, and the 1st under the current make-up. The first match of the season was played in August 2004, and the season ended in May 2005.

Blackburn Rovers U18 were the champions.

References

See also
Premier Reserve League
FA Youth Cup
Football League Youth Alliance
Premier League
The Football League

Premier Academy League
Academy League, 2004-05
Academy

ja:プレミアアカデミーリーグ